Pig is a simple, collecting card game of early 20th century American origin suitable for three to thirteen players that is played with a 52-card French-suited pack. It has two very similar and well known variants – Donkey and Spoons. It is often classed as a children's game. It may be descended from an old game called Vive l'Amour.

History 
Pig is first recorded in 1911 where it is called "a rather noisy game" in which the first player to collect a quartet (four of a kind) laid their cards down "either quietly or violently, as he may choose" and the last one to put cards down became "Pig". The number of rounds was agreed in advance and the player who came last the fewest number of times was the winner or "Big Pig."

Frey describes the name as a "bowdlerism" of "Vive l'Amour". The latter was an old, four-player game in which the aim was to be first to collect all 13 cards of one suit and Pig was thus a "modern simplification".{{efn|Frey does not say where he gets this information, but a mid-19th century source records that when the Patriarch of Venice, Jacques Monico was playing cards, he called "Vive Marie!" whenever the rules required him to shout "Vive l'Amour!"<ref>The North British Review (1854), p. 40.</ref>}} Although intended for children, the game was also apparently played by adults with special cards in those parts of the US where standard playing cards are taboo. 

In 1957, a variant, Donkey, is mentioned by Culbertson. The rules are identical; the main exception being that, whereas in Pig players touch their noses when they acquire a quartet, in Donkey, a number of objects – one fewer than the number of players – is placed in the middle and the first player with a quartet calls "Donkey!" and takes one. The subtle distinction between the two games is missed by some later authors. Gibson (1974) states that the games are "practically identical", while Maguire describes Pig but calls it Donkey. Maguire introduces the rule that 'donkeys' receive the letters of the word  and the first to spell the whole word is the overall loser. He also records the game of Spoons for the first time, describing it as a variant in which, however, the player who stays to the end without spelling  is the overall winner. Arnold equates Pig and Donkey, while Spadaccini and Bicycle Cards faithfully describe the original Pig.Bicycle Cards (2001), p. 292. Katz conflates Pig with Spoons and uses the whole pack instead of the selecting and shuffling 4 quartets per player, but adds some interesting variations. A good summary of the rules and variations for Pig and Spoons is at pagat.com.

 Rules 
 Pig 
The rules have changed little over time. Frey's rules are as follows:

Pig is suitable for six to ten-year olds. Three to thirteen may play, but four to seven is best. The aim is to be first to collect a quartet, i.e. four cards of the same rank, known as a book. The game requires as many quartets as there are players e.g. if five play, five quartets are used from a 52-card pack and the rest laid aside. Players are dealt four cards each which they pick up and view. Then all the players simultaneously discard one card face down to their left and, after doing so, they all pick up the card from the player to their right. A player who collects a book immediately touches the nose with a finger. As soon as they spot this, the other players do likewise. The last player to touch the nose is the Pig and loses the deal.

According to Culbertson, the game is best for more than three players – "the more the merrier" – and is often played by adults at parties as an ice-breaker.

Variations:
 Go! or Start!: The dealer calls "Go" or "Start" to initiate the passing each time. Once all players have passed their cards to the left, if no-one has a quartet, play continues until any player has a quartet._ (2014), p. 197.
The first player to be assigned  is the overall loser and, optionally, has to oink like a pig. Alternatively, whoever is assigned  is eliminated from the game so that the last player standing is the overall winner.
 Pointing: Players point to their noses instead of touching them.
 Twin Pack: For more than 13 players, two packs may be used.
 Two Winners: The loser drops out after each deal, and the last two left in are joint winners.

 Donkey 
Having probably emerged by 1945, the rules of a variant called Donkey are described in the 1957 Culbertson's Hoyle. They are the same as in the early version of Pig above, except that "a number of chips, matches, or other tokens" are used; always one fewer than the number of active players. These objects are placed in the middle. A player who collects four of a kind, calls "Donkey" and takes a chip, etc. The others now also pick up a chip if they can and the player left without a chip is the Donkey and loses the game.

Maguire (1990) adds the requirement for a scorekeeper and introduces the rule that, each time a player becomes the Donkey, that player is assigned a letter from that word. The first player to be assigned all the letters, i.e. , is the loser.

Variations: 
 Swap!: The dealer calls "Swap" each time to initiate the exchanging of cards.
 Prizes: For a party game, prizes are used as the objects.

 Spoons 

The name Spoons first appears in 1990. It is essentially Donkey using spoons as the objects to be picked up. The player left without a spoon in each deal is assigned a letter from the word 'spoons'. The player who gets  is eliminated from the game, and the game continues. The last player standing is the winner.

Variations:
 Stockpile: A whole 52-card pack is used, and so there is a stockpile from which the dealer draws each time and a discard pile to which the player on his or her right passes a card each time.
 Five Cards: Players are dealt five cards each, but still only need a four-of-a-kind to pick up a spoon.
 Extreme Spoons/Hidden Spoons: Instead of the middle of the play area as usual, the spoons are placed in some inconvenient location nearby.BRI (2012).
 Series: As its name implies, it is a series of games with one player eliminated each time, and the last player standing is the overall winner.
 Two Winners: Similar to Series, but the last two players left in are joint winners.

 Tongue 
In the game of Tongue, players quietly stick out their tongue when they have a quartet.

 Tactics 
Tactics may include:Bluffing: Bluffing is allowed. Spoons may be reached at any time as long as they are not touched. This may distract the others or even cause players to grab a spoon prematurely which may result in their elimination.Eyes on the spoons: Players keep an eye on the number of spoons in case one has been taken without anyone noticing.
 Continuing to play. After sticking out a tongue or collecting a spoon, a player may continue to pass and pick up to confuse other players, but must keep the quartet intact. This is not possible with Pig as one hand is needed to touch the nose.

See also
 Happy Families - quartet-collecting game
 My Ship Sails - collecting game in which several cards of one suit are needed to win
 Musical chairs - elimination game involving players, chairs and music

 Footnotes 

References

 Literature 
 _ (1854). The North British Review, Vol. XX. November 1853–February 1854. Edinburgh: Kennedy.
 _ (2014), The Card Games Bible, Hamlyn, London: Octopus. 
 Bathroom Reader's Institute (BRI). 2012. Uncle John's Book of Fun. Portable Press. 
 Arnold, Peter (2009). Chambers card games for families. Chambers Harrap, Edinburgh. 
 Culbertson, Ely (1957). Culbertson’s Card Games Complete. Arco.
 Foster Jnr., Walter (2018). 101 Games to Play Before You Grow Up. Lake Forest, CA: Quarto. 
 Frey, Richard L. (1947) [Also Albert Morehead and Geoffrey Mott-Smith, but they were not permitted by contract to allow their names to be used]. The New Complete Hoyle. David McKay.
 Frey, Richard L., Morehead, Albert H. and Geoffrey Mott-Smith (1956). The New Complete Hoyle. NY: Garden City Books.
 Gibson, Walter Brown (1974). Hoyle’s Modern Encyclopedia of Card Games. Dolphin.
 Hapgood, George (1911). Home Games. Philadelphia: Penn.
 Kansil  Joli Quentin (2001). Bicycle Official Rules of Card Games, 90th edn. Cincinnati: USPC.
 Katz, Nikki (2012). The Book of Card Games. Simon & Schuster.
 Maguire, Jack (1990). Hopscotch, Hangman , Hot Potato & Ha Ha Ha. New York, London, Toronto, Sydney: Simon & Schuster. .
 Ostrow, Albert A. (1949) [1945]. The Complete Card Player. 1st edn published in England. London: Bodley Head.
 Parlett, David (2008). The Penguin Book of Card Games, Penguin, London. 
 Spadaccini, Stephanie (2005). The Big Book of Rules''. London, NY, etc: Penguin.

External links
 Arneson, Erik (2019). How to Play Spoons at www.thesprucecrafts.com. 
 Pig, Spoons - rules at pagat.com
 Rules for Pig at Classic Games and Puzzles.com

Party games
Card games for children
Card games introduced in 1947
Card passing games
American card games